Pterolophia robusta is a species of beetle in the family Cerambycidae. It was described by Maurice Pic in 1928. It is known from Vietnam.

References

robusta
Beetles described in 1928